Dacrydium guillauminii, commonly known as cat-tail Rimu or swamp Dacrydium, is a species of conifer in the family Podocarpaceae. It is found only in New Caledonia. It is a slow growing shrub or small tree with roots that grow in water, and reaches a height between 1 and 2 metres.

The species occurs on the banks of rivers and lakes in the south of Grand Terre, the largest island of New Caledonia. It is threatened by wildfires and habitat destruction. Its name honors the French botanist André Guillaumin, who spearheaded the study of the flora of New Caledonia.

Description
The bark is brown and fibrous, covered with small scales and lenticels when young, and developing many small cracks and crevices as it grows older. The female cones grow at the tips of the twigs or sometimes on short lateral twigs, and may each contain up to five seeds.

Distribution and habitat
Dacrydium guillauminii is endemic to New Caledonia where it occurs in the southeast of the country. Its range is restricted to a small area around Rivière des Lacs, Lac en Huit, Lac Intermédaire and Grand Lacs, where it grows on the margins of streams and lakes.

Status
In its habitat beside watercourses, this shrub often grows in association with Retrophyllum minus and Callitris pancheri, two other endangered conifers endemic to New Caledonia, and it sometimes hybridises with Dacrydium araucarioides. The area where they live is prone to wildfires, which kill the shrubs and trees, and part of the area has been inundated as a result of the filling of a reservoir. With its habitat being degraded and the number of mature plants in decline, the International Union for Conservation of Nature has assessed the conservation status of Dacrydium guillauminii as being "critically endangered".

References

guillauminii
Critically endangered plants
Endemic flora of New Caledonia
Taxonomy articles created by Polbot